The 1108th Signal Brigade is a United States Army unit responsible for running much of the Raven Rock Mountain Complex and providing strategic communication support to the White House and the Joint Chiefs of Staff. It was based at Fort Ritchie, but was recommended to be transferred to Fort Detrick, Maryland during the 1995 Base Realignment and Closure.

On 16 October 2003, the 1108th Signal Brigade at Fort Detrick, Maryland was re-designated the 21st Signal Brigade.

References

External links
 Home Page (archived)

Signal brigades of the United States Army